In mathematics, the weakly chained diagonally dominant matrices are a family of nonsingular matrices that include the strictly diagonally dominant matrices.

Definition

Preliminaries

We say row  of a complex matrix  is strictly diagonally dominant (SDD) if . We say  is SDD if all of its rows are SDD. Weakly diagonally dominant (WDD) is defined with  instead.

The directed graph associated with an  complex matrix  is given by the vertices  and edges defined as follows: there exists an edge from  if and only if .

Definition

A complex square matrix  is said to be weakly chained diagonally dominant (WCDD) if
  is WDD and
 for each row  that is not SDD, there exists a walk  in the directed graph of  ending at an SDD row .

Example

The  matrix

is WCDD.

Properties

Nonsingularity

A WCDD matrix is nonsingular.

Proof:
Let  be a WCDD matrix.
Without loss of generality, let  be such that  for all .
Since  is WCDD, we may pick a walk  ending at an SDD row .

Taking moduli on both sides of

and applying the triangle inequality yields

and hence row  is not SDD.
Moreover, since  is WDD, the above chain of inequalities holds with equality so that  whenever .
Therefore, .

Recalling that an irreducible matrix is one whose associated directed graph is strongly connected, a trivial corollary of the above is that an irreducibly diagonally dominant matrix (i.e., an irreducible WDD matrix with at least one SDD row) is nonsingular.

Relationship with nonsingular M-matrices

The following are equivalent:
  is a nonsingular WDD M-matrix.
  is a nonsingular WDD L-matrix;
  is a WCDD L-matrix;

In fact, WCDD L-matrices were studied (by James H. Bramble and B. E. Hubbard) as early as 1964 in a journal article in which they appear under the alternate name of matrices of positive type.

Moreover, if  is an  WCDD L-matrix, we can bound its inverse as follows:
   where   
Note that  is always zero and that the right-hand side of the bound above is  whenever one or more of the constants  is one.

Tighter bounds for the inverse of a WCDD L-matrix are known.

Applications

Due to their relationship with M-matrices (see above), WCDD matrices appear often in practical applications.
An example is given below.

Monotone numerical schemes

WCDD L-matrices arise naturally from monotone approximation schemes for partial differential equations.

For example, consider the one-dimensional Poisson problem
   for   
with Dirichlet boundary conditions .
Letting  be a numerical grid (for some positive  that divides unity), a monotone finite difference scheme for the Poisson problem takes the form of 
   where   
and

Note that  is a WCDD L-matrix.

References

Matrices